North Harwich station was located in North Harwich, Massachusetts on Cape Cod.

External links

Harwich, Massachusetts
Old Colony Railroad Stations on Cape Cod
Stations along Old Colony Railroad lines
Former railway stations in Massachusetts
Railway stations in Barnstable County, Massachusetts